The ZCBJ Lodge No. 46, also known as Bohemian Hall, is an historic building located in Prague, Oklahoma that was built in 1917. It was listed on the National Register of Historic Places on March 8, 1984.  The building historically served as a meeting hall for the Czech community, hosting a Zapadni Ceska Bratrska Jednota lodge that was the oldest Czech fraternal order in Oklahoma.  The lodge was originally organized in 1891 as a branch of the Czech-Slovak Protective Society, but was incorporated into Zapadni Ceska Bratrska Jednota in 1897.

See also 
 Czech Hall

References

External links

 Image of ZCBJ Lodge No. 46

Western Fraternal Life Association
Czech-American culture in Oklahoma
Czech-Slovak Protective Society
Clubhouses on the National Register of Historic Places in Oklahoma
Buildings and structures completed in 1917
National Register of Historic Places in Lincoln County, Oklahoma
1917 establishments in Oklahoma
Brick buildings and structures